Cornelis Springer (1817–1891) was a Dutch 19th-century cityscape painter.

Biography
Born in Amsterdam, he was a pupil of his father, the carpenter Willem Springer (1778–1857). He was a pupil of the painters Hendrik Gerrit ten Cate, Kasparus Karsen, and Jacobus van der Stok.  He became a member of the Amsterdam painters collective Felix Meritis and won a gold medal for a painting of a church interior in 1847. He is known for watercolors, etchings, and drawings, especially of city views and town scenes that he sketched while traveling around the country. He was awarded the Leopold order of Belgium in 1865, and in 1878 he was invited with Jozef Israëls to advise the Dutch Ministry of Public Affairs on the plans for the Rijksmuseum.

Springer died in Hilversum in 1891.

Paintings

References

External links
Cornelis Springer on Artnet
C. Springer's sketchbooks and more in Teyler's Museum
Collection works in Dordrechts Museum
Cornelis Springer paintings, watercolours, drawings
Works in the Rijksmuseum Amsterdam

1817 births
1891 deaths
19th-century Dutch painters
Dutch male painters
Painters from Amsterdam
Teylers Museum
19th-century male artists
19th-century Dutch male artists